Wendy Onyinye Osefo (née Ozuzu, born May 21, 1984) is a Nigerian-American political commentator, public affairs academic, and television personality. She is an assistant professor at Johns Hopkins School of Education. She is also a main cast member of The Real Housewives of Potomac.

Early life and education 
Born in Nigeria, Osefo immigrated to the United States with her family at the age of 3 to Durham, North Carolina before settling in Maryland. She earned a Bachelor's degree in political science from Temple University and a Master of Arts degree in government from Johns Hopkins University. In 2012, Osefo completed a M.Sc. in public affairs with a concentration in community development from Rutgers University–Camden. In 2016, she became the first Black woman to earn a Ph.D. in public affairs and community development from Rutgers-Camden. Her dissertation was titled Engaging low-income parents in schools: beyond the PTA meeting. Gloria Bonilla-Santiago was Osefo's doctoral advisor.I

Career 
Osefo is a contributor for The Hill, the founder and chief executive officer of 1954 Equity, and an assistant professor at Johns Hopkins School of Education. In 2014, she served as the inaugural director of the Masters of Arts in Management Program at Goucher College.

She is a board member for the late Congressman Elijah Cummings' Youth to Israel Program, Children's Scholarship Fund Baltimore, and The Education Foundation of Baltimore County Schools.

In 2020, it was announced that Osefo had joined the fifth season of The Real Housewives of Potomac.

Awards 
In 2017, Osefo was named one of 12 Pan African Women to Watch by Face2Face Africa.
She received the 2017 Outstanding Graduate Award from her alma mater, Johns Hopkins University.
Also in 2017, she received the Distinguished Recent Alumni Award from The Johns Hopkins University.
She is the recipient of the Diversity Recognition Award.
Osefo was named in the 2017 40 Under 40 class by the Baltimore Business Journal.
The Baltimore Sun named Osefo as one of the 25 Women to Watch.
She was named a 2018 Black Women in Media honoree for her work in media and television.

Personal life
In August 2011, she married Edward Osefo. The two reside in Finksburg, Maryland with their three children. Their relationship is regularly showcased on The Real Housewives of Potomac.

She is a member of Alpha Kappa Alpha sorority.

References

External links 
 
 

1984 births
Living people
African-American academics
Alpha Kappa Alpha members
American political commentators
American public relations people
American women academics
Goucher College faculty and staff
Johns Hopkins University alumni
Nigerian emigrants to the United States
Nigerian expatriate academics in the United States
Nigerian philanthropists
Nigerian women academics
Rutgers University–Camden alumni
Temple University alumni